Oncaea venusta is a species of copepod with a cosmopolitan distribution, but lacking from the Arctic Ocean. The front of the head is unusually wide, and the body is brightly coloured, usually yellow–orange, but sometimes red. O. venusta feeds on a variety of zooplankton and phytoplankton.

References

Poecilostomatoida
Crustaceans described in 1843